A Step into the Darkness is a 2009 Turkish drama film, directed by Atil Inac, starring Suzan Genç as an Iraqi refugee who travels to Turkey in search of her missing brother after losing her entire family when soldiers raid their village.

Production
Atil Inac's second feature film A Step into the Darkness was in local theaters on September 17, 2010. The film was premiered at the 33rd Montreal World Film Festival in the summer of 2009, where it was highly praised by Quebecers. It was the opening film of the International Film Festival of Kerala, India. It won the Golden Reel Award for Best Cinematography at the Tiburon International Film Festival in San Francisco and Best Film Award at the South European Film Festival in Los Angeles. “A Step Into the Darkness” was written by Avni Özgürel - Atil Inac and produced by Ayfer Özgürel. It was shot on location in Iraqi cities of Arbil and Mosul, and in Adiyaman, Urfa, and Istanbul, Turkey.

Plot
The film tells the tragic story of an Iraqi-Turkish girl, Cennet, who loses her entire family during a US-led operation against insurgents in her village in US-occupied Iraq. She makes a distressing journey through the border between Turkey and Iraq to find her brother who had been sent to Turkey for treatment.

Release

General release

Reception

Awards
 21st Ankara International Film Festival (March 11–21, 2010) - Best Supporting Actress Award: Selen Uçar (Won)
 Tiburon International Film Festival - Golden Reel Award for Best Cinematography: Atıl İnaç (Won)
 17th Adana "Golden Boll" International Film Festival (Sept 20-26, 2010) - Most Promising Newcomer (actress): Suzan Genç (Won)

See also 
 2009 in film
 Turkish films of 2009

References

External links
 

2009 films
2009 drama films
Films set in Turkey
Films shot in Iraq
Turkish drama films